Take It Easy Baby may refer to:

 "Take It Easy Baby", a song written by Gary Paxton recorded in 1961 by Jeri Lynne Fraser
 "Take It Easy Baby", a song written by Sonny Boy Williamson II on the 1963 recording Sonny Boy Williamson and the Yardbirds
Take It Easy Baby, a 1976 Taste album (see Rory Gallagher discography)
Take It Easy Baby, a 1980 album by Buckwheat Zydeco
 "Take It Easy Baby", a song written by Van Morrison from the 2017 album Versatile

See also
Take It Easy (disambiguation)